Counter-Strike: Malvinas is a multiplayer first-person shooter modification of Counter-Strike: Source, developed and distributed by Argentinian web hosting company Dattatec. The mod was released worldwide on 4 March 2013 and utilizes the Source game engine. The game is set in Stanley, the capital of the Falkland Islands, and revolves around a group of Argentine special forces capturing the archipelago from British terrorists. The objective of the game is similar to that of the Counter-Strike series; each round is won by either detonating a bomb or by eliminating all members of the enemy team. Counter-Strike: Malvinas pays homage to the 1982 Falklands War, in which an estimated 650 Argentine and 255 British servicemen died.
The mod prompted strong controversy in the United Kingdom; Dattatec's website was targeted by British hackers on 27 March 2013.

Gameplay
 
Identical to the gameplay of Counter-Strike: Source, the mod retains its team-based objective-orientated first-person shooter gameplay. The aim of the game revolves around defusing a bomb or killing all members of the enemy team; the ultimate goal is to win more rounds than the opposing team. Once players are killed, they do not respawn until the next round. Each team consists of two opposing groups of four players.

Counter-Strike: Malvinas is set in a 2013 recreation of Stanley (referred to in-game as "Puerto Argentino", its Argentine name), the capital of the Falkland Islands. The map features landmarks such as Stanley Cathedral and war memorials dedicated to the Falklands War. The Argentine team spawns near the cathedral, whereas the opposing British team begins in the Argentine graveyard.

Background and release
Fernando Llorente, a spokesman for Dattatec, stated that on 27 March 2013, two of the company's websites were attacked using DDoS, with hackers attempting to "saturate" the domain's connection. Llorente further revealed that the attack was 5 gigabits per second in strength; the equivalent of 5000 PCs connecting to both websites at the same time every second, although he admitted that Dattatec's technical team eventually blocked the attack. In a statement issued on 28 March 2013, Llorente stated that:

References
Notes

Citations

2013 video games
First-person shooters
Linux games
Multiplayer video games
MacOS games
Source (game engine) mods
Video game mods
Video games developed in Argentina
Windows games
War video games set in the British Empire